White Line Fever is the 2002 autobiography of Lemmy (Ian Fraser Kilmister), the founder of the British rock band Motörhead.

Editions
Simon & Schuster (Trade Division)  Edition: Hardcover; November 4, 2002
Pocket Books (a division of Simon & Schuster)  Edition: Paperback; June 2, 2003
Citadel Press  Edition: Paperback; January 1, 2004

References

Motörhead
Music autobiographies
2002 non-fiction books
Simon & Schuster books